Chicota is an unincorporated community in Lamar County, Texas, United States.

Notable people
Buck Frierson (1917-1996), baseball player (Cleveland Indians)

Education
The North Lamar Independent School District serves area students.

Notes

External links
 

Unincorporated communities in Texas
Unincorporated communities in Lamar County, Texas